The 2010 Aegon Pro-Series Loughborough was a professional tennis tournament played on indoor hard courts. It was the first edition of the tournament which is part of the 2010 ATP Challenger Tour. It took place in Loughborough, Great Britain between 8 and 14 November 2010.

ATP singles main-draw entrants

Seeds

 Rankings are as of November 1, 2010.

Other entrants
The following players received wildcards into the singles main draw:
  Jamie Baker
  Daniel Cox
  Daniel Evans
  Joshua Milton

The following players received entry from the qualifying draw:
  Max Raditschnigg
  Sean Thornley
  Roman Valent
  Marcus Willis

Champions

Men's singles

 Matthias Bachinger def.  Frederik Nielsen, 6–3, 3–6, 6–1

Women's singles
 Lara Michel def.  Anna Fitzpatrick, 6–2, 6–2

Men's doubles

 Henri Kontinen /  Frederik Nielsen def.  Jordan Kerr /  Ken Skupski, 6–2, 6–4

Women's doubles
 Jocelyn Rae /  Jade Windley def.  Jana Jandová /  Petra Krejsová, 6–3, 5–7, [10–4]

External links
ITF Search 
ATP official site

Aegon Pro-Series Loughborough
Sport in Loughborough
2010 in English tennis
Aegon Pro-Series Loughborough
2010s in Leicestershire